Deeksha Seth (born 14 February 1990) is an Indian actress and model. A finalist in Femina Miss India in 2009, she made her acting debut in the Telugu film Vedam (2010).

Early life
Seth was born on 14 February 1990 in Delhi. Since her father was working for ITC Limited and was often transferred, her family has been shifting regularly and living in various parts of India, including Mumbai, Chennai, Kolkata, Rajasthan, Gujarat and Uttar Pradesh as well as in Kathmandu, Nepal. She finished her nursery and schooling up to third class in Chennai, and enrolled at a college in Mumbai. She attended a boarding school at Mayo College Girls' School, Ajmer. She has one elder sister, who is currently living and working in Mumbai. She cites that she wanted to become an marine archaeologist.

Career
During her first year at college in 2009, she was spotted by a Femina Miss India contest scout during an NSS event, who persuaded her into modeling and to participate at the beauty pageant. She created a portfolio with the help of a friend of her father, and competed in the contest. In spite of her lack of modeling experience, she was one of the top 10 finalists, winning the Fresh Face title.

During a modeling assignment in Hyderabad, the casting director of the Telugu film Vedam by Krish, had spotted her. She was cast for the role of Pooja, the rich girlfriend of the lead character Cable Raju (portrayed by Allu Arjun), after 70 girls were rejected by the makers, citing that she "loved the script and decided to give it a shot". Vedam, an anthology drama film, opened to high critical acclaim, winning accolades at various award functions. In quick succession, she signed two more films, with the Ravi Teja-starrer Mirapakay releasing next, which emerged a high commercial success. Two weeks later after Mirapakaay, the action drama Wanted with Gopichand, which constituted her debut as a lead female character, released and ended up as a box-office bomb. She has been signed for three more Telugu projects, Rebel alongside Prabhas and Tamannaah, Nippu opposite Ravi Teja again, and the socio-fantasy film Uu Kodathara? Ulikki Padathara?. She was also roped in for two Tamil films, Suseenthiran's Rajapattai with Vikram, as well as the Silambarasan-starrer Vettai Mannan, scheduled to release in 2013.

Filmography

References

External links

 
 

Living people
Actresses in Telugu cinema
Actresses in Tamil cinema
Female models from Delhi
Indian film actresses
21st-century Indian actresses
1990 births
Actresses in Kannada cinema
Actresses from Delhi
Actresses in Hindi cinema